Murdo may refer to:

 Murdo, South Dakota, a city in the United States
 List of Murdos (mountains), summits in Scotland that are over 3,000 feet
 An Anglicised form of the given name Murchadh, including a list of people named Murdo

See also